Wintersett is a hamlet in the civil parish of Huntwick with Foulby and Nostell, in the City of Wakefield in West Yorkshire, England. At the 2011 census the population of the whole parish, including several other settlements, was 164. Until 1974 it formed part of Wakefield Rural District. It gives its name to the nearby Wintersett Reservoir.

In 2013 "Wintersett Lakes Caravan site" opened at the rear of The Anglers Retreat public house, offering electric hookup standings at a location near to Anglers Country Park.

References

External links

Villages in West Yorkshire
Geography of the City of Wakefield